The canton of Chalonnes-sur-Loire is an administrative division of the Maine-et-Loire department, in western France. Its borders were modified at the French canton reorganisation which came into effect in March 2015. Its seat is in Chalonnes-sur-Loire.

It consists of the following communes:

Bécon-les-Granits 
Chalonnes-sur-Loire 
Champtocé-sur-Loire 
Chaudefonds-sur-Layon 
Denée 
Erdre-en-Anjou (partly)
Ingrandes-Le Fresne sur Loire 
La Possonnière 
Rochefort-sur-Loire 
Saint-Augustin-des-Bois 
Saint-Georges-sur-Loire 
Saint-Germain-des-Prés 
Saint-Sigismond 
Val d'Erdre-Auxence

References

Cantons of Maine-et-Loire